Stanislav Nedkov (born December 9, 1981) is a Bulgarian professional mixed martial artist who last competed in 2015. A professional since 2006, he has formerly competed for the UFC, World Victory Road, and Pancrase.

Background
Nedkov was born in Veliko Tarnovo and began wrestling when he was 10 years old. A two-time national champion in freestyle wrestling, he has also had first-place finishes in international tournaments in Russia, Moldova, Turkey, and Bulgaria. Nedkov has also studied in sumo under Kotooshu Katsunori and won his first grappling championship a year after he began learning Brazilian jiu-jitsu.

Mixed martial arts career

Early career
Nedkov made his professional mixed martial arts debut in relative obscurity in 2006 and amassed an undefeated record of 7-0 in his native Bulgaria.

Following a year away from the sport, Nedkov was signed to a contract with the Japanese promotion World Victory Road.

Ultimate Fighting Championship
In June 2010, it was announced Nedkov had signed a contract with the UFC. Nedkov was expected to make his UFC debut against Rodney Wallace on August 7, 2010 at UFC 117, but Nedkov was forced out of the bout with an injury and replaced by Phil Davis

Nedkov was expected to face Steve Cantwell on October 16, 2010 at UFC 120.  However, less than 48 hours before the event, Cantwell was forced off the card after suffering a knee injury during a pre-fight training session.  With no time to find a suitable opponent for Nedkov, the bout was cancelled.

Nedkov eventually made his UFC debut against Luiz Cane at UFC 134. Nedkov won the fight via TKO (punches) in the first round.

Nedkov was scheduled to return to the UFC at UFC 142.  He was expected to take on Fabio Maldonado at this event, however alleged visa problems forced Nedkov to withdraw from the bout.

Nedkov faced Thiago Silva on November 10, 2012 at UFC on Fuel TV 6. He lost via arm-triangle choke in the third round. However, on November 21, 2012, it was revealed that Silva had failed his post fight drug test, testing positive for marijuana metabolites and the result was overturned and changed to a No Contest.

Nedkov made his Middleweight debut against Tom Watson on February 16, 2013 at UFC on Fuel TV: Barão vs. McDonald. He lost the back-and-forth fight via TKO in the second round. Both participants earned Fight of the Night honors for their performance.

Nedkov returned to the octagon against Nikita Krylov in a light heavyweight bout at UFC on Fox: Gustafsson vs. Johnson on January 24, 2015. He lost the fight via submission in the first round, and was subsequently released from the promotion shortly after.

Personal life
Nedkov married Bulgarian politician Yuliana Doncheva in 2010.

Championships and accomplishments
Ultimate Fighting Championship
Fight of the Night (One time) vs. Tom Watson

Mixed martial arts record

|-
| Loss
| align=center| 12–2 (1)
| Nikita Krylov
| Submission (standing guillotine choke)
| UFC on Fox: Gustafsson vs. Johnson
| 
| align=center| 1
| align=center| 1:24
| Stockholm, Sweden
| 
|-
| Loss
| align=center| 12–1 (1)
| Tom Watson
| TKO (knees and punches)
| UFC on Fuel TV: Barão vs. McDonald
| 
| align=center| 2
| align=center| 4:42
| London, England
| 
|-
| NC
| align=center| 12–0 (1)
| Thiago Silva
| NC (overturned) 
| UFC on Fuel TV: Franklin vs. Le
| 
| align=center|3
| align=center|1:45
| Macau, SAR, China
| 
|-
|  Win
| align=center| 12–0
| Luiz Cane
| TKO (punches)
| UFC 134
| 
| align=center| 1
| align=center| 4:13
| Rio de Janeiro, Brazil
| 
|-
|  Win
| align=center| 11–0
| Augustin Helgiu
| Submission (rear-naked choke)
| BMMAF: Warriors 13
| 
| align=center| 1
| align=center| 2:14
| Sofia, Bulgaria
| 
|-
|  Win
| align=center| 10–0
| Kevin Randleman
| Decision (split)
| World Victory Road Presents: Sengoku 11
| 
| align=center| 3
| align=center| 5:00
| Tokyo, Japan
| 
|-
|  Win
| align=center| 9–0
| Travis Wiuff
| TKO (punches)
| World Victory Road Presents: Sengoku 8
| 
| align=center| 3
| align=center| 0:42
| Tokyo, Japan
| 
|-
|  Win
| align=center| 8–0
| Masayuki Kono
| TKO (punches)
| Pancrase: Shining 10
| 
| align=center| 1
| align=center| 1:35
| Tokyo, Japan
| 
|-
| Win
| align=center| 7–0
| Adelin Lutckanov
| Submission (rear-naked choke)
| MMA Bulgaria
| 
| align=center| 1
| align=center| N/A
| Veliko Tarnovo, Bulgaria
| 
|-
| Win
| align=center| 6–0
| Goce Candovski
| Decision (unanimous)
| Shooto: Bulgaria
| 
| align=center| 2
| align=center| 5:00
| Sofia, Bulgaria
| 
|-
| Win
| align=center| 5–0
| Yanko Kolev
| Submission (rear-naked choke)
| Shooto: Bulgaria
| 
| align=center| 1
| align=center| 2:38
| Sofia,  Bulgaria
| 
|-
|  Win
| align=center| 4–0
| Kamen Georgiev
| TKO (punches)
| Shooto: Bulgaria
| 
| align=center| 1
| align=center| 2:11
| Sofia, Bulgaria
| 
|-
| Win
| align=center| 3–0
| Vladimir Shumanov
| TKO (submission to punches)
| Ichigeki: Bulgaria
| 
| align=center| 1
| align=center| 1:16
| Varna Bulgaria
| 
|-
| Win
| align=center| 2–0
| Krasimir Bonchev
| TKO (punches)
| The Day of the Champions
| 
| align=center| 1
| align=center| 0:33
| Haskovo, Bulgaria
| 
|-
|  Win
| align=center| 1–0
| Iliyan Mitev
| TKO (punches)
| MMA Bulgaria
| 
| align=center| 1
| align=center| N/A
| Veliko Tarnovo, Bulgaria
|

See also
 List of male mixed martial artists

References

External links
Official Stanislav Nedkov Website

Fighter.bg profile (in Bulgarian)

1981 births
Living people
Bulgarian male mixed martial artists
Bulgarian practitioners of Brazilian jiu-jitsu
People awarded a black belt in Brazilian jiu-jitsu
Light heavyweight mixed martial artists
Mixed martial artists utilizing freestyle wrestling
Mixed martial artists utilizing Sumo
Mixed martial artists utilizing Brazilian jiu-jitsu
People from Veliko Tarnovo
Ultimate Fighting Championship male fighters
Sportspeople from Veliko Tarnovo Province